Bengtskär Lighthouse is located in the Archipelago Sea about 25 kilometers south west of Hanko, Finland. The lighthouse was built in 1906 on the Bengtskär skerry where it rises 52 meters above sea level and is the highest one in the Nordic countries. The lighthouse had been planned for some time, but after the steamer  s/s Helsingfors  ran aground in 1905 in the vicinity en route from Lübeck to Helsinki resulting in several crew members trapped and drowned on board, the project gained urgency and was completed during the following year. Soviet troops stationed in Hanko during the Continuation War, disturbed by a Finnish observation post in the light house tried to blow up and destroy the lighthouse during the Battle of Bengtskär in 1941.

These days Bengtskär Lighthouse is a popular tourist destination and is visited annually by roughly 13,000 to 15,000 tourists. There are some hotel rooms, and a sauna made of granite.

See also 

 Battle of Bengtskär

References

External links 
 Bengtskär Lighthouse website 
 

Lighthouses completed in 1906
Kimitoön
Lighthouses in Finland
Buildings and structures in Southwest Finland
Lighthouse museums
Maritime museums in Finland
Tourist attractions in Southwest Finland
1906 establishments in Finland